Calochilus caesius, commonly known as the blue beard orchid, is a species of orchid endemic to the Northern Territory in Australia. It has a single leaf which is not present during flowering and up to five pale green, very short-lived flowers with a bluish-red "beard".

Description
The column lacks the sham "eyes" of some other beard orchids. Flowering occurs from December to February but each flower only lasts a few hours.

Taxonomy and naming
Calochilus caesius was first formally described in 2004 by David Jones and the description was published in The Orchadian from specimens collected at Yarrawonga Swamp near Darwin. The specific epithet (caesius) is a Latin word meaning "bluish gray".

Distribution and habitat
The blue beard orchid grows in swampy places with rushes and sedges in the far north of the Northern Territory including Garig Gunak Barlu National Park, Kakadu National Park and Melville Island.

References

caesius
Orchids of Australia
Orchids of Queensland
Plants described in 2004